R. Jan Pinney, CLU, ChFC, CPCU (born December 11, 1946) is an American businessman, author, speaker, and consultant. He received national attention for various issues discussed during his tenure on the Roseville Joint Union High School District Board of Trustees. He has also testified before Assembly and Senate committees on insurance and finance. Jan is a prominent and active figure within the insurance industry where he advocates at the State and National levels for common-sense laws, transparency in regulator oversight, and a consumer-first focus on insurance company product designs, sales distribution, and consumer protection. Most recently, he has led a coalition of NAILBA, LIDMA, and NAIFA leaders in fighting for an insurance agent exemption to the TCPA Laws that currently prevents a licensed agent from contacting a consumer (their client) regarding an existing insurance policy via telephone without written permission. Under the current rules, agents may only have telephone contact with their clients without written permission for a period of 18-months from the inception of a new insurance policy or are subject to fines.

Business experience
 Russell Jan Pinney began his first life insurance agency—the R. Jan Pinney General Agency of Transamerica Occidental Life Insurance Company—in 1972. In 1975, it was incorporated as Pinney Insurance Center, Inc. It is a life insurance brokerage general agency, serving over 26,000 life insurance agents nationwide, and representing over 60 life insurance companies.
 In 1985, Pinney merged the property and casualty portion of Pinney Insurance with the John A. Francis Insurance Agency to create Francis-Pinney Insurance Associates, Inc. In 1997, Pinney affiliated with ISU, a national property and casualty insurance marketing group and became ISU Francis-Pinney Insurance Services, Inc., which was honored in 2017 for its 20-year ISU affiliation.
 In 2002, Pinney created an online consumer-based life insurance website called Wholesale Insurance. Pinney's WholesaleInsurance.net and TrustedQuote.com are life insurance websites where consumers can compare rates from various life insurance companies at the same time.
 In 2012, Pinney became an Executive Lead at Insureio, a tech start-up building a CRM for life insurance agents. Formerly DataRaptor, Insureio launched a beta version to select agents and advisors in October 2013. In 2014, Insureio acquired the rights to Pinney Insurance’s EZLifeSales platform, with more than 9,000 individual users. In October 2016, the company reached a milestone of over 100,000 unique leads received and processed by its users. In September 2017, the company was named a finalist for the 2017 LIDMA Innovation Award.
 Pinney served for five years as a member of the board of directors, and Vice President of LifeMark Partners, a "single production source comprised nationally of 43 independent life brokerage agencies".

Volunteer business experience
 Life Insurance Direct Marketers Association (LIDMA): Pinney is currently serving as the organization's 2018 and 2019 President.
 National Association of Insurance and Financial Advisors (NAIFA): Pinney served as president of the Sacramento Association of Life Underwriters from 1990-1991 and as president of NAIFA California from 2004 to 2005.
 Pinney served as Membership Chair of the National Association of Independent Life Brokerage Agencies (NAILBA) and as a member of The International Forum and the Association For Advanced Life Underwriting (AALU).

School board tenure
 Russell Jan Pinney was appointed to the Roseville Joint Union High School District Board of Trustees in 1995 to fill a vacant seat. He was reelected in 1996, 2000, 2004, 2008 and 2012, serving for 21 1/2 years on the school board. He served as board president in 1998-1999, 2001-2003, 2005–2006, 2009-2010, and 2013-2014. After his final board meeting in 2016, the Roseville Joint Union High School District Superintendent Ron Severson wrote, "He was a catalyst for the adoption of International Baccalaureate, for the effort to increase A-G completion, and for the Equal Opportunity Schools effort to expand our Advanced Placement programs."
 Pinney voted against the controversial "Quality Science Education Policy", keeping anti-evolution theories from being taught (against state laws) in local high schools.
 Pinney voted against allowing students to be released from school without parent's knowledge or consent for confidential medical treatments.
 Pinney was a founding board member of the Eureka Schools Foundation, which marked its 25th year of service in 2017.

Awards
 As of 2020, Russell Jan Pinney is a 45-year Life and Qualifying Member of the Million Dollar Round Table, and a 17-year member of the Top of the Table. To be a member of Top of the Table requires "producing at a level six times that of MDRT membership requirements."
 Pinney was recognized as Distinguished Trustee by the Placer County School Boards Association in 1999, 2003 and 2014.
 In 2011, Pinney received the Distinguished Service Award from NAIFA California.
 Pinney received commendations from Governor Arnold Schwarzenegger in 2005, Senator Dave Cox in 2005, Senator Ted Gaines in 2011 and Assembly Member Roger Niello in 2005 for his service to the insurance industry and the community.
 Pinney was awarded the Army Commendation Medal during active duty service as a lieutenant on assignment as the Deputy Provost Marshal of Fort Rucker, Alabama.
 Pinney was awarded the California Commendation Medal for his service as a captain in the California National Guard.

National and local publications
 Russell Jan Pinney was featured in Comstock's magazine in 2016, in an article titled "In Whom We Trust."
 Pinney was quoted in an article titled "The BGA business model in 2017 and beyond" on ThinkAdvisor.com.
 Pinney was quoted on the issue of senior supplements (cognitive testing) often required to submit a senior's life insurance application in "'Senior Supplements' On The Rise In Life Insurance Applications" on ThinkAdvisor.com.
 Pinney was quoted in the national magazine Advisor Today articles "Making Your Business a Top-Flight Operation" and "Know Your Score".
 Pinney has been quoted numerous times in the Sacramento Bee.

Appearances before governmental bodies
 Russell Jan Pinney has testified before the California Senate Insurance Committee, The California Department of Insurance, and the Association of California Life and Health Insurance Companies.
 In 2005, he spoke along with California Insurance Commissioner John Garamendi and ACLI President and former Governor John Keating before the California Assembly, State Senate and Department of Insurance.

Community and military service
 Russell Jan Pinney is a Distinguished Past President of the Sacramento Suburban Kiwanis Club where his focus was on youth programs.
 Pinney served as Assistant District Chair for the Boy Scouts of America.
 Pinney was drafted into the U.S. Army in 1966, attended Officer Candidate School after finishing Basic and Advanced Infantry training, and was commissioned an officer at age 20.  His active duty service included assignment as the Deputy Provost Marshal of Fort Rucker, Alabama, while a lieutenant.
 Pinney served in the California National Guard where his service included commanding a Mechanized Infantry Company and serving as Battalion S1, both while a captain.

References

1946 births
Living people
American businesspeople in insurance
Businesspeople in insurance